Ronald Arthur Tinker  (13 April 1913 – 16 February 1982) was a notable New Zealand musterer, military leader, scientific administrator and sales agent. He was born in Christchurch, North Canterbury in 1913.

References

1913 births
1982 deaths
New Zealand Army officers
New Zealand farmers
New Zealand military personnel of World War II
New Zealand military personnel of the Malayan Emergency
New Zealand public servants
New Zealand Officers of the Order of the British Empire
People from Christchurch
New Zealand recipients of the Military Cross
New Zealand recipients of the Military Medal